Tartronic acid semialdehyde is the organic compound with the formula OCHCH(OH)CO2H.  The molecule has three functional groups, aldehyde, alcohol, and carboxylic acid.  A white solid, it occurs naturally.  A near neutral pH, it exists as the hydrated carboxylate (HO)2CHCH(OH)CO2−, which is referred to as tartronate semialdehyde.  Tartronate semialdehyde is produced and consumed on a prodigious scale as an intermediate in photorespiration, an undesirable side reaction that competes with photosynthesis.  It is produced biologically by the condensation of two equivalents of glyoxalate:  
2OC(H)CO2H  →  OC(H)CH(OH)CO2H  +  CO2
This condensation is catalyzed by tartronate-semialdehyde synthase.

References

Alpha hydroxy acids
Aldehydic acids